This is the discography documenting albums and singles released by the American R&B singer-songwriter Howard Hewett.

Albums

Studio albums

Christmas albums

Live albums

Singles

References

External links
Howard Hewett discography at AllMusic
Howard Hewett discography at Discogs

Soul music discographies
Rhythm and blues discographies
Discographies of American artists